Elizabeth Holmes Fisher (September 13, 1867 – November 13, 1955) was an American art collector and the first woman elected to the University of Southern California’s board of trustees. She founded the USC Fisher Museum of Art in 1939.

Fisher was born in Illinois, the eldest of eight children. Her husband is the businessman Walter Harrison Fisher. She died in Santa Barbara, California and was buried in Glendale, California.

References

1867 births
1955 deaths
American art collectors
University of Southern California people